Russians in Korea do not form a very large population, but they have a history going back to the Korean Empire. The community of Russian subjects/citizens in Korea has historically included not just ethnic Russians, but members of minority groups of Russia as well, such as Tatars, Poles, and, more recently, return migrants from among the Koryo-saram (ethnic Koreans whose ancestors migrated to the Russian Far East in the late 19th century) and Sakhalin Koreans.

Migration history

Early history

The earliest Russian subject in Korea is believed to have been Afanasy Ivanovich Seredin-Sabatin (Афанасий Иванович Середин-Сабатин), an architect from a family of Swiss origin; he was invited to Korea from Tianjin, China in 1884 by King Gojong. Karl Ivanovich Weber became the Russian Empire's official representative in Seoul in April 1885. With the establishment of formal relations, more Russians began migrating into Korea throughout the 1890s, largely via Manchuria. At that time, the community was centred on the Russian legation, opened in 1890, and the Russian Orthodox Church of Saint Nicholas, opened in 1903, both located in Seoul's Jeongdong (located in present-day Jung-gu). The Russian community in these days was composed largely of missionaries, diplomats, and businessmen; Russia played an important role in the Korean politics of the era, and at one point, Gojong actually lived in the Russian compound, in fear of his life after the 1895 assassination of his wife Queen Min. However, with Russia's defeat in the 1905 Russo-Japanese War, Russian influence in Korea began to wane.

The 1922 influx of Russian refugees from the fall of Vladivostok to the Red Army would completely change the face of the community. In October of that year, more than 15,000 refugees landed at Wonsan, Kangwon-do. Roughly half were quickly able to obtain onward passage to Shanghai, but the refugees who had not taken valuables with them when fleeing Vladivostok were stuck in Wonsan for the winter; they relied on charitable donations and day labour for their survival. According to William Arthur Noble, an American missionary in Korea, no more than 20% were literate; they lived either on overcrowded ships, or in barely heated customs warehouses at the docks. In the spring of 1923, the refugees began to disperse, moving on to Harbin, where there was a significant community of Russians, or even to overseas destinations in Latin America.

In February 1925, Japan finally recognised the Soviet Union, and handed over the old Russian Legation building to the new Soviet ambassador. By the late 1920s, there were only around a hundred Russians living in Seoul; former nobles and officials lived in Jeongdong, while a community of Tatars lived and worked in the markets near Namdaemun and Honmachi (modern-day Myeongdong). However, due to class divisions within the community, the two groups had little interaction with each other. George Yankovsky, the grandson of a Polish noble exiled to Siberia, also maintained a resort in Chongjin which was popular among the Russian communities of East Asia, but virtually unknown to other westerners; when the Soviets invaded North Korea, most of the Russians still living there were arrested and forcibly repatriated to the Soviet Union.

After independence from the Japanese Empire
New Russian communities have formed in various cities in South Korea. In Seoul, a "Little Russia" began to form in Jung-gu's Gwanghui-dong, near Dongdaemun, in the late 1980s. Roughly 50,000 people from post-Soviet states were estimated to live in the area in 2004, down from 70,000 several years previously due to deportations of illegal immigrants. In Busan, Russians are concentrated in the former "Texas Town" in Jung-gu's Jungang-dong; roughly 200 are estimated to live in the city permanently, with several hundred more on short-term visas, along with a large transient population of Russian sailors.

Religion

After the Korean War (1950-1953), South Koreans were unfavorably disposed towards Russia because of its alliance with North Korea. Korean Orthodox believers did not want to have any relations with the Russian Orthodox Church. As a result, the Orthodox Community of South Korea found itself cut off from the rest of the Orthodox Church; that is the community did not belong to any ecclesiastical jurisdiction.

This very serious ecclesiological problem was resolved as follows; On 25 December 1955, after the Christmas Divine Liturgy, the General Assembly of the Orthodox Community of South Korea unanimously decided to request to come under the jurisdiction of the Ecumenical Patriarchate of Constantinople. The Ecumenical Patriarchate accepted the request and, since then, the Korean Orthodox Church has remained a metropolis of the See of Constantinople.

After the collapse of the communist regime in Russia and the Balkans in the 1990s, the first economic immigrants from Orthodox countries began to arrive in South Korea. Many of them, being strangers among strangers, were interested in finding an Orthodox church. From the beginning, they found refuge and support in the arms of the Korean Orthodox Church. The then Metropolitan Sotirios Trambas of Korea embraced them all with his love and paternal affection and slowly created the first nucleus of Slavic-speaking Orthodox faithful. He himself learned how to celebrate the Divine Liturgy in Slavonic and since 1992 in Seoul (in the chapel of the Dormition) or at the Monastery of the Transfiguration in Kapeong, where the pilgrims spent many weekend, he celebrated the Divine Liturgy for them. He also held special services for Slavic-speakers on Christmas Day and other Feast days with the old Calendar in order to give them a sense of familiarity and belonging. In 1995, during his historic first official visit to Korea, the Ecumenical Patriarch Bartholomew laid the foundation stone of the chapel of Saint Maximus the Greek.

Since then the Orthodox Metropolis of Korea has undertaken the responsibility and pastoral care of all the Orthodox residing in the country as well as those who are temporary visitors and workers, such as sailors and entrepreneurs. In other words, all Orthodox believers of various nationalities (Koreans, Russians, Greeks, etc.) are “under the Omophorion,” or spiritual jurisdiction and care, of the Ecumenical Patriarch. In order to provide proper pastoral care to all Orthodox in Korea, apart from the Cathedral of St. Nicholas in Seoul, there is also the Chapel of St. Maximus the Greek, in which the Services and the Divine Liturgy are celebrated in Slavonic for Slavic-speakers, and occasionally in English for English speakers. Also, in the church of the Annunciation in the Busan, the chapel of Saint George is used for the celebration of the Divine Liturgy in Slavonic for Slavic-speakers who reside in and near Busan.

Russians in Pyongyang have sometimes been served by Orthodox clergy sent from Vladivostok since 2002. The Church of the Life-Giving Trinity in Pyongyang was dedicated in 2006. It was built at the order of Kim Jong-il after his visit to the church of Innocent of Irkutsk in Khabarovsk.

Notable people

 Denis Laktionov, football player
 Andrei Lankov, historian and journalist
 Park No-Ja, (formerly Vladimir Tikhonov), professor, author, columnist
 Timofey Lapshin, biathlon athlete
 Valeri Sarychev, football goalkeeper and coach
 Ruslan Bernikov, Hockey Player for Anyang Halla
 Sergei Tarasov, pianist and professor at Keimyung University in Daegu.
 Rushan Ziatdinov, professor at Keimyung University in Daegu.
 Oleg Shitin, pianist and professor at Keimyung University in Daegu.
 Andrei Grigorev, professor at Keimyung University in Daegu.
 Eduard De, professor at Keimyung University in Daegu.
 Gi Khan Ten, professor at Keimyung University in Daegu.
 Janna Ballod, professor at Seokyeong University in Seoul.

See also
Sakhalin Koreans
Korean Orthodox Church
Immigration to South Korea
Russians in Japan

References

Notes

Sources

Further reading

External links
 Russian Korea
 Russian Collection - University of Hawaii at Manoa Library
 Russian Cultural Center, Seoul
 Russia and North Korea

European diaspora in Korea
Korea
Korea–Russia relations
 
 
 
Korea–Soviet Union relations